Ali Khattab (born July 4, 1977) is an Egyptian composer and guitarist. In his works, he combines the elements of two musical worlds and traditions: The Arab-Oriental and the Gypsy-Andalusian, flamenco. From the age of seventeen, the time when he first starts performing on stage, everything he does is meant to lead him to two places: the cradle of flamenco, Jerez de la Frontera. From then on, Ali spends a lot of time in Andalucia, meeting and performing with influential flamenco musicians, singers, guitarists, and dancers who introduce him to the true universe of flamenco. Following a tour in Spain and the middle east, Ali Khattab's first album named "Al Zarqa", (Blue eyed brunette) was  released in March 2010 in Madrid, Spain. In a recent radio interview the artist explained that his music as the name of his album is like a blue eyed brunette a mix of two worlds in perfect harmony.

Discography
2010: Al-Zarqa
2014: Sin Pais

Awards
Independent Music Awards 2012: "A..dios" - Best World Traditional Song

References

External links
 Ali Khattab On Facebook
 Ali Khattab Official Myspace

1977 births
Living people
Musicians from Cairo
Egyptian composers
Egyptian guitarists
21st-century guitarists